The Type 648 repair ship is a Chinese submarine repair ship currently in service with the People's Liberation Army Navy (PLAN). It was one of the two units consisting the proposed mobile repair flotilla, but the floating dry dock with lifting capacity of 2000 tons was never built, and Type 648 repair ship was the one only completed. Type 648 has received with NATO reporting name Dadao class (大岛, meaning Great Island).

The Type 648 is designed by the 3rd Directorate of the 708th Institute of China State Shipbuilding Corporation (CSSC), which is also more commonly known as China Shipbuilding and Oceanic Engineering Design Academy (中国船舶及海洋工程设计研究)  nowadays, after receiving the assignment from PLAN in October 1975. Construction begun in July 1980 and completed in December 1984, and the ship was formally handed over to PLAN in January 1985 with name as Dong-Xiu (东修, meaning East Repair in Chinese) 911. Type 648 was specially designed to repair submarines and has elaborate repair facilities on board. After decades of service and numerous upgrades, the ship remain in active service in the early 2010s.

Specifications:
Length (m): 84
Waterline (m): 78.7
Depth (m): 5.8
Draft (m): 4
Beam (m): 12.4
Displacement (t): 1962
Speed (kn): 15.1
Range (nmi): 2000
Endurance (day): 20
Crew: 105
Armament: 4 Type 61 twin 25 mm gun
Propulsion: 2 D39 diesel engines @ 1360 kW (1850 hp)

References

Auxiliary ships of the People's Liberation Army Navy
Auxiliary repair ship classes

zh:大岛级打捞救生船